The 1893 Greensburg Athletic Association season was their fourth season in existence. The team's record for this season is largely unknown.

Schedule

Game notes

References

Greensburg Athletic Association
Greensburg Athletic Association seasons
Greensburg Athletic Association